Frederic Schenck (October 10, 1887 – February 28, 1919) was an American fencer. He competed in the individual épée event at the 1912 Summer Olympics.  He graduated from Harvard University and University of Oxford.

References

External links
 

1887 births
1919 deaths
American male épée fencers
Olympic fencers of the United States
Fencers at the 1912 Summer Olympics
Sportspeople from Pottsville, Pennsylvania
Harvard College alumni
Alumni of the University of Oxford